Karvonen is a Finnish surname. Notable people with the surname include:

Aki Karvonen (born 1957), Finnish cross-country skier 
Janet Karvonen, American basketball player
Jorma Karvonen (born 1949), Finnish ski-orienteering competitor
Juho Karvonen (1888–1966), Finnish logger and politician
Jusu Karvonen (born 1993), Finnish footballer
Veikko Karvonen (1926–2007), Finnish marathon runner

Finnish-language surnames